North Kildare RFC is an Irish rugby team based between Maynooth and Kilcock, County Kildare. It is part of the North Kildare Club, which also includes cricket, hockey, bowls, tennis and bridge sections. It is also the home of Bear Gym.

The club caters for adult, youths, mini and girls rugby. The club's first team currently plays in Division 2A of the Leinster League, and its teams participate in IRFU Leinster Branch and North Midlands Area competitions. As of 2021, the First XV is captained by Calvin Coffey. The club colours are cerise, white and blue. The First XV were promoted to Division 2A of the Leinster League at the end of the 2015 season, the second promotion in 3 years. In the 2015/16 season the club finished 3rd in 1B, the highest the club had ever reached in Leinster since the Leinster League began in 1993/94.

Representative players & former players

Ireland
Bob Casey
Devin Toner
Will Connors

Leinster
Bob Casey
Devin Toner
Will Connors
Marcus Hanan

Connacht
Ted Robinson
Cormac Daly

Ireland U20s

 Marcus Hanan
 Cormac Daly

Ireland Youths

 Sean Brady

Ireland Schools

 Luke Satchwell
 Cathal Duff

Leinster Juniors

 Gavin Satchwell
 Tom Satchwell
Conor McCrossan
 Joe Gerry
 Robert Waters

New Zealand Universities
James Mullarkey

Honours
Provincial Towns Cup: 1953, 1958
Anderson Cup: 1978

Lalor cup: 2004

Speirs cup: 2005

Leinster Provincial Towns Plate: runner up 2010

Leinster League Division Three: 1999/2000, 2005/2006, 2008/2009,2010/2011
Leinster League Division Two A: 2014/5

References

External links
 North Kildare Sports Club website

Irish rugby union teams
Rugby clubs established in 1928
Rugby union clubs in County Kildare